The Letoon, sometimes Latinized as Letoum, was a sanctuary of Leto located 4km south of the ancient city of Xanthos to which it was closely associated, and along the Xanthos River. It was one of the most important religious centres in the region though never a fully-occupied settlement. 

The site is located south of the village Kumluova in the Fethiye district of Muğla Province, Turkey.

It was added as a UNESCO World Heritage Site along with Xanthos in 1988.

History

Archaeological finds at the site date to the late sixth century BC. This was before the Greek cultural hegemony in Lycia, which began in the early fourth century. In earlier times, the site was probably already sacred to the cult of an earlier mother goddess — she is Eni Mahanahi in Lycia — which was superseded by the worship of Leto, joined by her twin offspring.

In Greek mythology, a claim for an early cult of Apollo in the valley of the Xanthus, unsupported by history or archaeology, was provided by two myths, each connected to an eponymous "Lycus". One sprang from the autochthonous Telchines of Rhodes and would have colonized the region at the time of Deucalion's flood; the other Lycus was an Athenian brother of Aegeus driven from Athens, a seer who introduced the cult of Lycaean Apollo, which a folk etymology connected with Lycia and therefore made him its Athenian colonizer: see Lycus (mythology).

The foundations of the Hellenistic temple dedicated to Leto, and her children, Artemis and Apollo, have been excavated under the direction of Henri Metzger from 1962.  Archæologists have excavated much of the ruins; discoveries include the Letoon trilingual, bearing inscriptions in Lycian, Ancient Greek and Aramaic, which has provided crucial keys in the deciphering of the Lycian language; it is conserved in the Fethiye Museum.

The sacrosanctity of the site is the purport of an anecdote related by Appian concerning Mithridates, who was planning to cut down the trees in the sacred grove for his own purposes in his siege of the Lycian coastal city of Patara, but was warned against the sacrilegious action in a nightmare. The site remained active through the Roman period. The site was Christianised by the construction of an early church, which reused cut stone from the sanctuary, but was abandoned from the seventh century.

Notes

External links

 The official website of the French Archaeological Mission of Xanthos-Letoon
 UNESCO World Heritage Centre: Xanthos-Letoon
 Canadian Epigraphic Mission at Xanthos-Letoon, website of the research project on Xanthos and Letoon by Université du Québec à Montréal and Université Laval, including downloadable published works
 Extensive picture collection of Letoon
 Letoon Photo Guide

Lycia
World Heritage Sites in Turkey
Ancient Greek archaeological sites in Turkey
Archaeological sites in the Aegean Region
Leto